Yellow Quill 90-18 is an Indian reserve of the Yellow Quill First Nation in Saskatchewan.

References

Indian reserves in Saskatchewan
Division No. 14, Saskatchewan